WAAA-LD is a low-power television station in Valparaiso, Indiana, broadcasting locally on UHF channel 16 (virtual channel 49). Formerly known as W04CQ and licensed to serve Westville, Indiana, the station moved to channel 49 and resumed broadcasting on July 15, 2007, as WAAA-LP. The station was licensed for digital operations on January 28, 2020, moving to channel 16 and changing its call sign to WAAA-LD and its community of license to Valparaiso.

It is currently not known what programming the station broadcasts.

References

External links
 

LaPorte County, Indiana
AAA-LD
Television channels and stations established in 1992
1992 establishments in Indiana
Low-power television stations in the United States